The Mixed relay race of the 2023 World Athletics Cross Country Championships was run in Bathurst in New South Wales, Australia on 18 February 2023, with 15 teams of four athletes each, two men and two women, taking part.

Results
The race began at 15:30 local time.

See also
2017 IAAF World Cross Country Championships – Mixed relay
2019 IAAF World Cross Country Championships - Mixed relay
Senior men's race
Senior women's race
Junior men's race
Junior women's race
2023 World Athletics Cross Country Championships

References

mixed relay
Mixed relay race at the World Athletics Cross Country Championships